As of 2019, Malaysia is the sixth largest producer and exporter of Natural Rubber (NR), the leader in the production and export of rubber products, the largest consumer of natural rubber and the world's largest rubber gloves producer, with annual rubber gloves exports worth US$7.3 billion (RM29.8 billion) in 2020. The COVID-19 pandemic resulted in positive impact for the rubber industry as most countries import tons of rubber gloves. The rubber industry's annual growth was 12% more than that of the previous year. On the other hand, top glove factories say that an outbreak at their facilities on 25 November 2020 had negatively affected their trade.

Malaysia contributes to 46 percent of total rubber production in the world and produces about 1-5 million tons of rubber annually. The production of rubber has declined from the 1990s, when it used to be 615,222 tonnes.

Rubber manufacturers in Malaysia include local smallholders, plantations, multinationals and joint ventures with the United States, Europe, and Japan. Malaysia has a total rubber area of 1.07 million hectares, out of which 7.21 percent is owned by plantation companies. Ninety percent of production is accounted by smallholders who generally hold less than 40 acres of agricultural land. These statistics remain a major concern for the industry as these smallholders tend to move to other economic activities when the rubber price goes down.

The R&D infrastructure developed by Rubber Research Institute of Malaysia and Malaysian Rubber Board has made significant contributions and serves as a comprehensive R&D set up for a single commodity. Malaysia also produces specialty rubber such as the epoxidized natural rubber (Ekoprena) and deproteinized natural rubber (Pureprena) that can be used in green tires and engineering products. It was made to capitalize on the growing preference for natural and renewable materials.

Rubber grades supplied by Malaysia include:

 SMR - Standard Malaysian Rubber
 ENR, DPNR, and TPENR
 Low Protein Latex

References 

Malaysian Rubber Council